Arevelk (in Armenian Արեւելք meaning Orient) was a widely circulated and read Armenian newspaper published and circulated throughout the Ottoman Empire.

The newspaper was started by a collaboration of many Armenian writers including Arpiar Arpiarian. It was a literary and political newspaper with democratic tendencies. It subsequently attracted numerous writers who would eventually form the core of the Armenian realism movement. The paper became a prestigious opinion maker and was published uninterruptedly until the Armenian genocide of 1915.

Prominent contributors 
 Zabel Sibil Asadour
 Arshag Chobanian
 Msho Kegham
 Vahan Malezian
 Hrand Nazariantz
 Levon Pashalian
 Tlgadintsi
 Karapet Utudjian
 Yerukhan
 Krikor Zohrab

References 

Armenian-language newspapers
Newspapers published in Istanbul
Newspapers established in 1884
Turkish people of Armenian descent
Daily newspapers published in Turkey
1884 establishments in the Ottoman Empire